Gulin Countyis a county in the south of Sichuan Province, China, bordering Guizhou province to the north, south, and east. It is under the administration of Luzhou city.

Climate

See also
Luzhou

References

External links
Gulin County Government website

County-level divisions of Sichuan
Luzhou